Patrick Parrinder (born 1944) is an academic, formerly Professor of English at the University of Reading.  He retired in 2008.

Parringer was educated at Leighton Park School and King's College, Cambridge. He has written books of literary criticism on James Joyce and H. G. Wells, and was associate editor of the Oxford Dictionary of National Biography, focusing on literary authors in the period 1890–1920. He also edited texts of H. G. Wells published by Penguin Classics.

References

External links 

 
 

Academics of the University of Reading
Living people
1944 births
British academics of English literature
English male non-fiction writers